Grigory and Aksinya is a sculpture composition of principal characters of the epic novel And Quiet Flows the Don in Vyoshenskaya, Rostov oblast, Russia. It was designed by sculptor N. Mozhaev.

Description 
The sculpture composition illustrate one of the elements of the epic novel And Quiet Flows the Don. Monument is located on the left bank of the river Don. The monument is 6.5 m height. Barefoot Aksinya comes towards the khutor with a carrying pole. She is dressed in wide skirt and neck-flap. The sculptor captured the moment when Grigory, during a friendly conversation with his neighbor Aksinya, jokingly blocked off her path. A passage from And Quiet Flows the Don, which was immortalized in bronze:

History 
N. Mozhaev created a project of the monument in 1957. E. Mozhaeva, V. Desyatnichuk, V. Voloshin. G Holodnyi worked together on this sculpture composition also. Mikhail Sholokhov was shown a maquette. A writer adjusted  some minutiaes. He advised to change conical buckets with a cylindrical one and to change an Arab horse with a Don one. 26 years later, the project was accomplished. The monument was opened opposite the river port of Rostov-on-Don in 1983. In 1995 12-ton sculpture composition was transferred in Vyoshenskaya, where action of the novel takes place.

See also 
 Grigory and Aksinya in a boat (sculpture composition)
 Monument to the Don Cossacks

References 

Monuments and memorials built in the Soviet Union
Outdoor sculptures in Russia
1983 sculptures
Statues in Russia
Bronze sculptures in Russia
Statues of fictional characters
Monuments and memorials in Rostov Oblast
Cultural heritage monuments of regional significance in Rostov Oblast